Mad Buddies is a 2012 South African comedy film directed by Gray Hofmeyr, co-written by Gray Hofmeyr and Leon Schuster, and starring Leon Schuster, Kenneth Nkosi, Tanit Phoenix and Alfred Ntombela. Walt Disney Studios Motion Pictures acquired the film's distribution rights and released the film through the Touchstone Pictures banner. This production is an unofficial remake of the Jamie Uys films Fifty/Vyftig, Hans en die Rooinek and All the Way to Paris: films which, like this one, depict two adversaries having to assist each other to get out of awkward situations.

Plot
Enemies, Boetie (Leon Schuster) and Beast (Nkosi) are forced to embark on a road trip as unwitting subjects of a new TV reality show Mufasa Mufasa, Walla Habibi, devised by a TV producer, Kelsey, played by Tanit Phoenix. On camera, with the whole of South Africa in on the joke, the pair comes stuck at every stage of the journey until they discover that they have been conned and join forces to exact revenge.

Cast 
Leon Schuster as Boetie
Kenneth Nkosi as Beast
Tanit Phoenix as Kelsey
Alfred Ntombela as Minister Nda
Trevor Noah as Bookie
Chris Hill as Rowley

References

External links

2012 films
Films set in South Africa
English-language South African films
2012 comedy films
Touchstone Pictures films
South African comedy films